Players and pairs who neither have high enough rankings nor receive wild cards may participate in a qualifying tournament held one week before the annual Wimbledon Tennis Championships.

Seeds

  John Fitzgerald (qualified)
  Grant Connell (second round)
  Christian Saceanu (qualified)
  Guillaume Raoux (qualified)
  Jonathan Stark (qualified)
  Fernando Roese (qualifying competition)
  Gilad Bloom (second round)
  Chuck Adams (second round)
  Henrik Holm (qualified)
  Robbie Weiss (second round)
  Peter Lundgren (first round)
  Patrick Baur (first round)
  Carl Limberger (qualifying competition)
  Martin Laurendeau (second round)
  Nicolás Pereira (second round)
  Thomas Högstedt (second round)
  Andrei Olhovskiy (qualified)
  Stéphane Simian (second round)
  Grant Stafford (qualifying competition)
  Steve Bryan (qualified)
  Marcos Ondruska (qualifying competition)
  Daniel Orsanic (first round)
  Lars-Anders Wahlgren (first round)
  Nicola Bruno (first round)
  Fernon Wibier (first round)
  Laurent Prades (first round)
  Greg Rusedski (qualifying competition)
  Ramesh Krishnan (first round)
  Martin Wostenholme (second round)
  Tom Nijssen (qualifying competition)
  Fabio Silberberg (first round)
  Roger Rasheed (first round)

Qualifiers

  John Fitzgerald
  Dave Randall
  Christian Saceanu
  Guillaume Raoux
  Jonathan Stark
  Scott Davis
  Niclas Kroon
  Kent Kinnear
  Henrik Holm
  Branislav Stankovič
  Grant Doyle
  Rick Leach
  Steve Bryan
  Mark Knowles
  Andrei Olhovskiy
  John-Laffnie de Jager

Qualifying draw

First qualifier

Second qualifier

Third qualifier

Fourth qualifier

Fifth qualifier

Sixth qualifier

Seventh qualifier

Eighth qualifier

Ninth qualifier

Tenth qualifier

Eleventh qualifier

Twelfth qualifier

Thirteenth qualifier

Fourteenth qualifier

Fifteenth qualifier

Sixteenth qualifier

External links

 1992 Wimbledon Championships – Men's draws and results at the International Tennis Federation

Men's Singles Qualifying
Wimbledon Championship by year – Men's singles qualifying